The Lo Nuestro Awards or Premios Lo Nuestro (Spanish for "Our Thing") is a Spanish-language awards show honoring the best of Latin music, presented by Univision, a Spanish-language television network based in the United States. The awards began in 1989.

The artist with the most Premios Lo Nuestro awards is Puerto Rican singer Olga Tañón.

The awards ceremony features famous Latino actors, musicians and show business personalities. The show is broadcast all over the Americas. In February 2006, Univision announced that closed captioning in English would be offered for the first time in the history of the broadcast. The 2013 edition, which officially marked its 25th anniversary on the network, was dedicated to singer Jenni Rivera after her death in December 2012.

Background 
In 1989, the Lo Nuestro Awards were established by Univision, to recognize the most talented performers of Latin music. The nominees were initially selected by Univision and Billboard magazine, and the winners chosen by the public. Nominees and winners for the Lo Nuestro Awards were selected by a voting poll conducted among program directors of Spanish-language radio stations in the United States and the results were tabulated and certified by the accounting firm Arthur Andersen. The trophy awarded is shaped like a treble clef. The categories included were for the Pop, Tropical/Salsa, Regional Mexican and Music Video fields before the 2000 awards, from 2001 onwards categories were expanded and included a Rock field; for the Regional Mexican genre a Ranchera, Grupero, Tejano and Norteño fields were added; and Traditional, Merengue and Salsa performances were also considered in the Tropical/Salsa field. Before the Latin Grammy Awards inception, the Lo Nuestro Awards were considered as the Grammy Award equivalent for Latin music. Therefore, the Lo Nuestro ceremony was advanced from May to February since the 1st Latin Grammy Awards were held in September, 2000. The eligibility period for songs to be nominated are from October 1 to September 30.

Premio Lo Nuestro host cities

Premio Lo Nuestro a la Excelencia

In addition to categories for different genres of music, the honors include "Premio Lo Nuestro a la Excelencia", (literally, The "Ours" award for Excellence), a career or lifetime achievement award.

Notes
A. For the 2018 Lo Nuestro Awards, Univision commemorated the 30th anniversary of the awards by only presenting special awards. No nominations were presented that year.

References

External links

Premio lo Nuestro Official Site

 
Latin music awards
Hispanic American music
Univision original programming
Awards established in 1989
1989 establishments in Florida